Gaylon is a given name, generally but not exclusively male, which may refer to:

 Gaylon Alcaraz (born October 26, 1966), American community organizer and human rights activist
 Gaylon Lawrence (1934–2012), American businessman and farmer
 Gaylon Moore (born 1978), American former basketball player
 Gaylon Nickerson (born 1969), American former basketball player
 Gaylon Smith (1916–1958), American National Football League player
 Gaylon H. White, American sportswriter
 Gaylon Head (Born 1998) Public Figure

See also
 Galen (disambiguation)